Lilita Bērziņa (real name Lilija Priede-Bērziņa, born 17 July 1903, Riga - 27 May 1983, Riga) was a Latvian actor. In 1945, Bērziņa received the honorary title of Honoured Artist of the Latvian SSR, and later the honorary titles of People's Artist of the Latvian SSR (1947) and People's Artist of the USSR (1956).

Life 
From 1922, she worked in the Dailes Theater. In 1922, she made her film debut in the film " Psyche ". Her most famous film role is Mirta Saknīte in Riga Cinema Studio 's film " Limousine in the Colour of Midsummer Night " (1981). In 1995, a Latvian audience poll recognized this film as the best Latvian film of all time.

She is buried in Riga Forest Cemetery.

Legacy 
An award named after Lilitas Bēržinas, which has been given to Latvian actresses since 1987 for outstandingly acting during the previous season.

References 

1903 births
1983 deaths
20th-century Latvian actresses
Actors from Riga
Heroes of Socialist Labour